Heidi N Closet is the stage name of Trevien Anthonie Cheek, an American drag queen from Ramseur, North Carolina, best known for competing on the twelfth season of RuPaul's Drag Race, where she placed 5th and won the Miss Congeniality award.

Early life 
Cheek was raised in Ramseur, North Carolina. Her mother died at a young age, and she is estranged from her father. She was raised by her grandmother.

Career 
In 2014, shortly after turning 18, Cheek's sister invited her to a drag show in Winston-Salem, North Carolina. Cheek has said of seeing his first drag show, “I saw the glamour of being able to do whatever you want to do.” Cheek said his drag name “came from a joke. It started out as a lot of men from my hometown are closeted and they would always try and get my goodies and whatnotries. I was like, ‘There’s no need to be hiding in the closet.’”

Cheek's participation as a cast member on season 12 of RuPaul’s Drag Race was announced on January 23, 2020. He is the third contestant on the show from North Carolina, following Victoria "Porkchop" Parker (Season 1) and Stacy Layne Matthews (Season 3), and had not previously auditioned for the show. Heidi experienced an allergic reaction on her first day of shooting, but finished safe. During the competition, RuPaul expressed disapproval with her name choice, stating during episode 10: "I don't know if you've heard the story, but she came here as Heidi N Closet. Rotten!" With each episode RuPaul refers to Heidi by different names, including Heidi Ho, Heidi N Seeky, Heidi Hydrates, and Heidi Afrodite. Despite this, Heidi revealed during the Season 12 reunion episode that she had decided to keep her name.

Heidi was dubbed the "heart" of the season by Out. During the competition, she placed in the top three times, winning one challenge. She also placed in the bottom two on four occasions. Her first two times in the bottom she survived the lip sync, sending home Nicky Doll and Brita respectively. Her third time in the bottom she lip-synced against Jackie Cox, and both were saved by RuPaul in a double shantay. She was eliminated in the eleventh episode, placing 5th overall in the competition, after losing her fourth lip sync to eventual winner of the season Jaida Essence Hall. During the season finale, she was named Miss Congeniality as voted on by her peers.

He has experienced extreme poverty in his life and career, having indicated that he made $9,000 the year before competing on Ru Paul's Drag Race, while working at a gas station. When talking on his show Gap Chat, Heidi said, "When I went to Drag Race, I actually had only 33 cents in my bank account the day I showed up [...] Even to just pay for the suitcases to get there was stressful." Many queens join the show hoping that experience will pay out for them, but they first need to have a significant amount of money upfront to pay for their looks. Heidi borrowed money from his boyfriend and friends for materials, then sewed all his looks with his drag sisters. The quality of the looks came up during the season during various moments but the different financial starting points were never openly acknowledged. The show does not give any financial support to participants, they must all come with their costumes and are only compensated a few hundred dollars an episode. Heidi recounted the experience, "I’m sitting up here spending between $4,000 and $5,000 on everything. Whereas some girls spent 20, 30, 40, even $50,000 on garments [...]Yeah, my garments just aren’t gonna stand up to their outfits. It’s just not gonna happen.”

Music 
In February 2021, she released a music video for her first single, G.A.P, a parody of "WAP", featuring fellow RuPaul's Drag Race season twelve alum Widow Von'Du. In March 2021, Cheek will be featured in Tiger Queens: The Tiger King Musical, a TikTok musical parody of Tiger King, starring as the tiger.

Personal life
Cheek is openly gay and currently living in Los Angeles, California.

Filmography

Film

Television

Music videos

Web series

Discography

Featured singles

Titles

Awards and nominations

References

External links

Heidi N Closet's first single, GAP, a WAP parody

Living people
African-American drag queens
American drag queens
Gay entertainers
LGBT African Americans
LGBT people from North Carolina
People from Randolph County, North Carolina
Heidi N Closet
1994 births